This is a list of sovereign states and other territories by population, with population figures estimated for 2015 (rounded to the nearest 1,000). The figures are estimates for the United Nations (UN) "2015 annual statistics", which lists more than 100,000 population by country and territory.

The list includes all sovereign states and dependent territories recognized by the United Nations plus the territory under the effective control of the Republic of China (Taiwan).

This list adopts definitions of "country" on a case by case basis. The United Kingdom is considered as a single country while constituent countries of the Kingdom of the Netherlands are regarded separately.

See also
 List of countries
 List of countries by area 
 List of countries by past and future population
 List of countries by population
 List of countries by population in 1900
 List of countries by population in 2000
 List of countries by population in 2005
 List of continents by population
 List of religious populations
 World population
 Human geography
 United Nations

Notes

External links

2015
2015-related lists